Jack Diffin was an Irish international footballer and football manager. He played in goal for Belfast Celtic, Linfield, and Dartford, was capped once by his country, and briefly managed Port Vale.

Playing career
Diffin played for Belfast Celtic, Linfield and Dartford. He was capped by Ireland in 1931. After retirement he set up a road haulage business.

Management career
Diffin became a Port Vale director in 1944 and appointed team manager in October of that year. David Pratt was appointed as manager in December 1944, but failed to gain a release from the Air Force and so never managed to be a manager to the Vale other than in name only. Diffin remained the effective manager until August 1945, when Billy Frith was appointed. Diffin then concentrated on his board duties before being elected vice-chairman in 1946, finally stepping down in December 1957.

Business career
Diffin ran a general drapery and boot merchants business in Belfast and also established a road haulage company in England.

References

Association footballers from Northern Ireland
Pre-1950 IFA international footballers
Association football goalkeepers
Belfast Celtic F.C. players
Linfield F.C. players
Dartford F.C. players
Football managers from Northern Ireland
Port Vale F.C. managers
Port Vale F.C. directors and chairmen
Year of birth missing
Year of death missing